Qaraxanlı (also, Karakhanly) is a village and municipality in the Tovuz Rayon of Azerbaijan.  It has a population of 3,166.

References 

Populated places in Tovuz District